Michael Belcourt (born 29 August 1964) is a Canadian former cyclist. He competed in the individual pursuit at the 1992 Summer Olympics. In the qualifying round, he came in 15th place, advancing to Group B quarter-finals. He competed against Ivan Beltrami in Heat 3 of the Group B quarter-finals. Belcourt did not move on to the semi-finals. He was inducted into the Québec Cycling Hall of Fame in November 2012.

References

External links
 

1964 births
Living people
Canadian male cyclists
Olympic cyclists of Canada
Cyclists at the 1992 Summer Olympics
Cyclists from Montreal